The Draveil-Villeneuve-Saint-Georges strike was a strike action of sand quarry workers in Draveil, Vigneux, and Villeneuve-Saint-Georges in 1908 that ended with two workers dead and repression of the French CGT labor union.

References

Further reading 

 
 
 
 

1908 in France
1908 in Paris
Labor disputes in France
Revolutionary Syndicalism
May 1908 events
General Confederation of Labour (France)